Şahsevən Təzəkənd (also, Shahseven Tazakend and Tazakend) is a village and municipality in the Aghjabadi District of Azerbaijan. It has a population of 651. It is closest to the villages of Minakhorlu and Mughanly.

References 

Populated places in Aghjabadi District